K. V. Mohan Kumar is an Indian writer in Malayalam literature from Alapuzha District in Kerala. He has authored 33  books, including 9 novels and 12  collections of short stories.He scripted for 3 films: Kesu,Aaro Oraal and Clint.

Life
Mohan Kumar was born in Alleppey, as the son of K. Velayudhan Pillai and Lakshmi Kutty Amma. He started his career as a journalist and served as Correspondent and Sub Editor  in Kerala Kaumudi and Malayala Manorama for 12 years. He joined the State Civil (Executive) Service in 1993 and his administrative career started as Revenue Divisional officer, Adoor. He was selected to Indian Administrative Service in Kerala Cadre (2004 batch) and served as District collector in Palghat and Calicut, Rural Development Commissioner, Director of Higher Secondary Education and Director of Public Instruction (DPI) and Spl. Secretary, General Education. In 2009, he scripted for the  film Kesu, which won National award for best Children’s film. His first novel Sraadhasheham was adapted into a film titled Mazhaneerthullikal. 

Now he is the Chairman of Kerala State Food Commission, a Quasi-Judicial Authority constituted under National Food Security Act 2013.

Works
 Novels

 Sraadhasheham
 Hey Ram
 Jaranum Poochayum
 Ezhamindriyam
 Pranayathinte Moonnam Kannu
 Ushnarashi
 Edalakkudi Pranaya Rekhakal
 Mazhoor Thampan Randam Varavu
 Mahayogi

 Short story collection
 Akam Kazhchakal
 Knavallayile Kuthirakal
 Aliveni Enthu Cheyvu
 Bhoomiyude Anupatham
 Aasannamaranan
 Puzhayute Niram Irul Neelima
 Ente Gramakathakal
 Karappuram Kathakal
 Randu Pasukkachavatakkaar 
 Sampoorna Kathakal (1983-2020)
 Soundarya Bilahari Children's literature
 Appooppan Maravum Aakasha Pookkalum Ammuvum Manthrika Petakavum Meenukkutti Kanda Lokam Undakkannante Kazhchakal Other works
 Aligayile Kalapam (Novelette)
 Devi Nee Parayarundu / Jeevante Avasanathe Ila (Memoirs)
 Romila Oru Ormachithram (Memoirs)
 Devarathi (Travelogue)
 Manass Nee, Akasavum Nee  Ramanum Valmeekiyum Njaanum Translations in English
 The Third Eye of Love (Novel)
 Man Hunt (Novel)
 End of A Journey (Novel)
 Mother Dove & Magic Box (Children's literature)

Awards
 2018: Vayalar Award — Ushnaraasi ''
 2018: Kerala Sahithya Academy Award
 2020: Kovilan Novel Award  
 2019: Mahakavi P. Kunjiraman Nair Novel  Award    
 2019: Ankanam Shamsudheen Smruthi Novel Award
 2017 O V Vijayan Trust Literary Award 
 FOKANA Literary Award 
 AIMA Akshara Mudra Award 
 Basheer Puraskaram 
 K Surendran Novel Award
 Dr KM Tharakan’ Suvarnarekha ‘Sahithya Puraskaram
 Plavila Sahithya Puraskaram
 Sahrudaya Vedi Sahithya Puraskaram
 Thoppil Ravi Sahithya Puraskaram
 PN Panicker Literary Award

References

Living people
Malayali people
People from Alappuzha district
Writers from Alappuzha
Indian male short story writers
Malayalam-language writers
Malayalam short story writers
20th-century Indian short story writers
21st-century Indian short story writers
20th-century Indian male writers
21st-century Indian male writers
Year of birth missing (living people)